This article details Toulouse Olympique rugby league football club's 2016 season. This was Toulouse's first season back in the English competition since they left at the end of 2011. They competed in League 1. They finished the season on top of the table, but lost the promotion final to Rochdale Hornets who were crowned champions. Toulouse were promoted to the Championship in second place after they successfully came through the play-offs, beating Barrow Raiders in the play-off final. Toulouse also entered the Challenge Cup, reaching the sixth round where they lost to Super League side Wakefield Trinity.

Home matches were played at Stade Ernest-Argelès in Blagnac rather than at Toulouse's historic home ground of Stade Arnauné.

Kingstone Press League 1 

2016 League 1

Player appearances - League

Standings

Regular season

Super 8s

Challenge Cup 
Toulouse entered the Challenge Cup in Round 3. They were drawn away to face Cumbrian amateur side Wath Brow Hornets, winning 32–14. In Round 4, Toulouse defeated fellow League 1 side Gloucestershire All Golds 62–28 in France. In Round 5 they beat Championship side Leigh Centurions 10–8 at Stade Ernest-Argeles before bowing out at Super League side Wakefield Trinity, losing 40–22.

Player appearances - Cup

2016 transfers

Gains

Losses

References 

RFL League 1
2016 in English rugby league
2016 in French rugby league